Qaleh-ye Baba Mohammad (also Romanized as Qal‘eh-ye Bābā Moḩammad and Qal‘eh Bābā Mohammad; also known as Ghal‘eh Baba Moḩammad) is a village in Cheshmeh Sar Rural District, in the Central District of Khansar County, Isfahan Province, Iran. At the 2006 census, its population was 92, in 29 families.

References 

Populated places in Khansar County